41st Battalion or 41st Infantry Battalion may refer to:

 41st Battalion (French Canadian), CEF, an infantry unit of the Canadian Expeditionary Force during World War I
 41st Battalion, Royal New South Wales Regiment, a unit of the Australian Army
 41 Commando, a unit of the United Kingdom Royal Marine Corps
 41st Battalion Iowa Volunteer Infantry, a unit of the Union (Northern) Army during the American Civil War

See also
 41st Division (disambiguation)
 41st Brigade (disambiguation)
 41st Regiment (disambiguation)
 41st Squadron (disambiguation)